Harrison Bluff is a pale-colored trachyte headland forming the seaward termination of Trachyte Hill and marking the southern end of McDonald Beach on the western side of Mount Bird, Ross Island, Antarctica. Many skuas nest on the bluff. A survey station marked by a rock cairn was placed on the top of the northwest corner of the bluff by E.B. Fitzgerald of the Cape Bird party of the New Zealand Geological Survey Antarctic Expedition, 1958–59, and the bluff was named by the New Zealand Antarctic Place-Names Committee for J. Harrison, mountaineer-assistant with the expedition.

References

Headlands of Ross Island